Eshani Kaushalya (also known as Eshani Lokusuriyage, born 1 June 1984) is a Sri Lankan cricketer who  played for the Sri Lanka national women's cricket team. An all-rounder, she played as a right-handed batsman and a right-arm medium pace bowler.

Kaushalya made her debut for Sri Lanka during the 2005 Women's Cricket World Cup, scoring seven runs. She collected her first international wicket later during the tournament, trapping West Indian Juliana Nero leg before wicket. She batted well for Sri Lanka during the 2006 Women's Asia Cup, finishing top of the batting averages for her country, scoring 106 runs at 35.33, including her career high score of 57. During the 2013 Women's Cricket World Cup, she scored two half-centuries, against England and India, and was named as part of the team of the tournament by the International Cricket Council.

In February 2016, she along with Ama Kanchana recorded the highest 8th wicket partnership in WT20I history (39)

In October 2018, she was named in Sri Lanka's squad for the 2018 ICC Women's World Twenty20 tournament in the West Indies.

In October 2021, she announced her retirement from cricket.

References

1984 births
Living people
Asian Games medalists in cricket
Colts Cricket Club cricketers
Cricketers at the 2014 Asian Games
Asian Games bronze medalists for Sri Lanka
Medalists at the 2014 Asian Games
Kurunegala Youth Cricket Club women cricketers
Sri Lankan women cricketers
Sri Lanka women One Day International cricketers
Sri Lanka women Twenty20 International cricketers
Sri Lanka women cricket captains